Hasköy is a village in the Havsa District of Edirne Province in Turkey.

References

Villages in Havsa District